Grand Ayatollah Ali Asghar Mazandarani (1826–1911) was an Iranian cleric originally from Amirkola. He was a spiritual guide for many Shia Muslims.

Life
Mazandarani was educated in formal Islamic studies at Mirza Habibolah Rashti, Mola Esmaeil Borojerdi, Mohammad Ashrafi, Mohammad-Kazem Khorasani, and the Mirza Hosein khalili Tehrani seminary in Najaf. After completing his studies, he returned to Amirkola and Babol in Mazandaran and was responsible for religious affairs there.

Death
Mazandarani died in 1911. After his death, the Babol Amirkola city markets were closed, and people wore black in mourning. Mazandarani was buried in the Garden of Rizwan. His tomb was destroyed in Reza Khan age, but later repaired by Mazandarani's grandson, Haj Ali Asghar Khalili Amiri.

See also
 Mirza Jawad Maleki Tabrizi
 Hibatuddin Shahrestani
 Mohammad Hossein Esheni Qudejani
 Noureddin Qudejani Esheni

References

1826 births
1911 deaths
Iranian ayatollahs
Pupils of Muhammad Kadhim Khorasani